The 71st Emperor's Cup was held from December 14, 1991, to January 1, 1992. It was the last cup involving clubs from the old Japan Soccer League before it was reorganized into the J.League. The tournament was won by Nissan Motors, now known as Yokohama F. Marinos. The 12 JSL First Division clubs qualified automatically, while the other clubs qualified for the first round via regional qualifying cups.

First round

Second round

Quarterfinals

Semifinals

Final

References
 NHK

1991
Emperor's Cup
1992 in Japanese football